Sir Tristrem is a 13th-century Middle English romance of 3,344 lines, preserved in the Auchinleck manuscript in the National Library of Scotland. Based on the Tristan of Thomas of Britain, it is the only surviving verse version of the Tristan legend in Middle English.

Notes

Sources

Editions

External links
 Transcription and manuscript facsimile (National Library of Scotland)
 Text with glossary and notes (Robbins Library Digital Projects)
 Sir Tristrem translated and retold in modern English prose, the story from Edinburgh, National Library of Scotland MS Advocates 19.2.1 (the Auchinleck MS) (translated and retold from University of Rochester, Middle English Text Series – Texts Online: Middle English from Alan Lupack (Ed), 1994, Lancelot of the Laik and Sir Tristrem, Medieval Institute Publications for TEAMS).

13th-century poems
Arthurian literature in Middle English
Middle English poems
Tristan and Iseult